Elton Doku (born 1 October 1986 in Krujë) is an Albanian footballer who most recently played as a defender for hometown club Kastrioti in the Albanian Superliga.

Honours
KF Laçi
 Albanian Cup (1): 2014–15

References

1986 births
Living people
People from Krujë
Association football defenders
Albanian footballers
FK Partizani Tirana players
KF Erzeni players
Luftëtari Gjirokastër players
KF Skënderbeu Korçë players
KF Laçi players
KS Kastrioti players
FK Kukësi players